R.J. Harlick is a Canadian mystery writer.  Her Meg Harris mystery series is set in the Canadian wilderness.

With the Meg Harris mystery series Harlick introduces protagonist Meg Harris who has fled the urban frenzy of Toronto and her failed marriage to a remote wilderness property in West Quebec.  The only neighbour to her  property is the  reserve of the Fishhook Algonquins, or Migiskan Anishinabeg. Her sought after peace is interrupted by injustice and murder. Unable to ignore it, Meg invariably becomes enmeshed in a quagmire of murderous intrigue.""

Harlick is a member of, and former president of Capital Crime Writers.  She is also a member of, and former Regional Vice President of Crime Writers of Canada.  She is a member of Sisters in Crime.  She has participated as a panellist at various mystery conferences such as Bouchercon, Left Coast Crime, Bloody Words and Malice Domestic.

Reviewing the Evidence called her "the queen of Canadian wilderness fiction."

Biography
In her former career, Harlick worked for major computer corporations such as IBM and DMR Group, then with her own management consultancy practice.  She was a member of the Canadian Institute of Management Consultants and held the CMC designation.

She is an avid supporter of environmental causes and worked for several years on the board of the Ottawa Valley chapter of Canadian Parks and Wilderness Society.

Originally from Toronto, and an alumna of the University of Toronto, she, her husband, Jim, and poodle Sterling divide their time between living in Ottawa and West Quebec.

Publications

Novels
Death's Golden Whisper, Dundurn Press, 2004
Red Ice for a Shroud, Dundurn Press, 2006
The River Runs Orange, Dundurn Press, 2008
Arctic Blue Death, Dundurn Press, 2009 
A Green Place for Dying, Dundurn Press, 2012
Silver Totem of Shame, Dundurn Press, 2014 
A Cold White Fear, Dundurn Press, 2015
Purple Palette for Murder, Dundurn Press, 2017

Short stories
When the Red, Red Robin... in Bone Dance: a Crime and Mystery Collection by the Ladies Killing Circle, edited by Sue Pike and Joan Boswell RendezVous Press, 2003  
Lady Luck in Bloody Words; The Anthology, edited by Cheryl Freeman & Carol Soles Baskerville Books, 2003  
Seigneur Poisson in Fit to Die: a Crime and Mystery Collection by The Ladies Killing Circle, edited by Joan Boswell and Sue Pike RendezVous Press, 2001

Awards
Lady Luck 3rd place Winner of the Bony Pete Award, 2002

References

Sources
The Hamilton Spectator review of Arctic Blue Death
The Hamilton Spectator review of The River Runs Orange
R.J. Harlick on the UK based biography site, Fantastic Fiction
Books 'n' Bytes author listing for R.J. Harlick
R.J. Harlick bio on Rendezvous Press publisher's website
Canadian Authors Website
The Regina Leader Post article about R.J. Harlick by Mike Gillespie
Ottawa Public Library Foundation biography of R.J. Harlick
University of Toronto Arts and Science alumni, RJ Harlick
The Writers Union of Canada author profile of R.J. Harlick

External links 
 R.J. Harlick website
   Official Capital Crime Writers Profile on author R.J. Harlick
  Crime Writers of Canada Profile on R.J. Harlick

Living people
Canadian mystery writers
Canadian women novelists
Writers from Toronto
University of Toronto alumni
Year of birth missing (living people)
Women mystery writers
21st-century Canadian novelists
Canadian women short story writers
21st-century Canadian women writers
21st-century Canadian short story writers